Panscopus is a genus of broad-nosed weevils in the family Curculionidae. There are at least 20 described species in Panscopus.

Species
 Panscopus abruptus (Casey, 1895)
 Panscopus aequalis (Horn, 1876)
 Panscopus alternatus Schaeffer, 1908
 Panscopus bakeri Buchanan, 1936
 Panscopus bufo Buchanan, 1927
 Panscopus capizzii (Hatch, 1971)
 Panscopus coloradensis Van Dyke, 1936
 Panscopus convergens Buchanan, 1936
 Panscopus costatus Buchanan, 1927
 Panscopus erinaceus (Say, 1831)
 Panscopus gemmatus (LeConte, 1857)
 Panscopus impressus Pierce, 1913
 Panscopus johnsoni Van Dyke, 1935
 Panscopus longus Buchanan, 1936
 Panscopus maculosus Blatchley, 1916
 Panscopus michelbacheri Ting, 1938
 Panscopus oregonensis Buchanan, 1936
 Panscopus ovalis Pierce, 1913
 Panscopus ovatipennis Buchanan, 1936
 Panscopus pallidus Buchanan, 1927
 Panscopus remotus Van Dyke, 1949
 Panscopus rugicollis Buchanan, 1927
 Panscopus schwarzi Buchanan, 1927
 Panscopus squamifrons Pierce, 1913
 Panscopus squamosus Pierce, 1913
 Panscopus torpidus (LeConte, 1857)
 Panscopus tricarinatus Buchanan, 1927
 Panscopus wickhami Buchanan, 1936

References

 Alonso-Zarazaga, Miguel A., and Christopher H. C. Lyal (1999). A World Catalogue of Families and Genera of Curculionoidea (Insecta: Coleoptera) (Excepting Scotylidae and Platypodidae), 315.
 Poole, Robert W., and Patricia Gentili, eds. (1996). "Coleoptera". Nomina Insecta Nearctica: A Check List of the Insects of North America, vol. 1: Coleoptera, Strepsiptera, 41-820.

Further reading

 Arnett, R.H. Jr., M. C. Thomas, P. E. Skelley and J. H. Frank. (eds.). (2002). American Beetles, Volume II: Polyphaga: Scarabaeoidea through Curculionoidea. CRC Press LLC, Boca Raton, FL.
 Arnett, Ross H. (2000). American Insects: A Handbook of the Insects of America North of Mexico. CRC Press.
 Richard E. White. (1983). Peterson Field Guides: Beetles. Houghton Mifflin Company.

Entiminae